In baseball, an assist (denoted by A) is a defensive statistic, baseball being one of the few sports in which the defensive team controls the ball. An assist is credited to every defensive player who fields or touches the ball (after it has been hit by the batter) prior to the recording of a putout, even if the contact was unintentional. For example, if a ball strikes a player's leg and bounces off him to another fielder, who tags the baserunner, the first player is credited with an assist. A fielder can receive a maximum of one assist per out recorded. An assist is also credited if a putout would have occurred, had another fielder not committed an error. For example, a shortstop might field a ground ball cleanly, but the first baseman might drop his throw. In this case, an error would be charged to the first baseman, and the shortstop would be credited with an assist. Unlike putouts, exactly one of which is awarded for every defensive out, an out can result in no assists being credited (as in strikeouts, fly outs and line drives), or in assists being credited to multiple players (as in relay throws and rundown plays). The left fielder (LF) is one of the three outfielders, the defensive positions in baseball farthest from the batter. Left field is the area of the outfield to the left of a person standing at home plate and facing toward the pitcher's mound. The outfielders have to try to catch long fly balls before they hit the ground or to quickly catch or retrieve and return to the infield any other balls entering the outfield. The left fielder must also be adept at navigating the area of left field where the foul line approaches the corner of the playing field and the walls of the seating areas. Being the outfielder closest to third base, the left fielder generally does not have to throw as far as the other outfielders to throw out runners advancing around the bases, so they often do not have the strongest throwing arm, but their throws need to be accurate. The left fielder normally plays behind the third baseman and shortstop, who play in or near the infield; unlike catchers and most infielders (excepting first basemen), who are virtually exclusively right-handed, left fielders can be either right- or left-handed. In the scoring system used to record defensive plays, the left fielder is assigned the number 7.

Left fielders are most commonly credited with an assist when they throw the ball to an infielder who tags a runner attempting to advance on the basepaths, even on a caught fly ball that results in an out (see tag up); of special importance are throws to the catcher if the runner is trying to reach home plate to score a run, perhaps on a sacrifice fly. Left fielders will often record assists by throwing out runners who try to advance farther than the batter, such as going from first to third base on a single, or batter/runners who try to stretch a hit into a longer one. Left fielders also earn assists on relay throws to infielders after particularly deep fly balls, by throwing to a base to record an out on an appeal play, or in situations where they might deflect a fly ball before another defensive player makes the catch. Outfielders record far fewer assists than other players due to the difficulty of making an accurate throw in time to retire a runner from a great distance; middle infielders routinely record more assists in a single season than outfielders do in their entire careers. Assists are an important statistic for outfielders, giving a greater indication about an outfielder's throwing arm than assists by infielders do. In recent years, some sabermetricians have begun referring to assists by outfielders as baserunner kills.

The list of career leaders is dominated by players from the 1890s through 1920s, including the dead-ball era, due to that period's emphasis on more aggressive baserunning. Only four of the top 14 players were active after 1932, only two of them after 1945. Only two of the top 34 single-season totals were recorded after 1924, and only one after 1936; only seven of the top 68 have been recorded since 1944. Because game accounts and box scores often did not distinguish between the outfield positions, there has been some difficulty in determining precise defensive statistics prior to 1901; because of this, and because of the similarity in their roles, defensive statistics for the three positions are frequently combined. Although efforts to distinguish between the three positions regarding games played during this period and reconstruct the separate totals have been largely successful, separate assist totals are unavailable; players whose totals are missing the figures for pre-1901 games are notated in the table below. Jimmy Sheckard is the all-time leader in career assists as a left fielder with 243; this total does not included his assists during the first four years of his career from 1897 through 1900, when he is believed to have played 168 games in left field. Zack Wheat (231) and Duffy Lewis (209) are the only other players credited with more than 200 career assists after 1900. Michael Brantley, who had 55 assists through the 2022 season to place him tied for 108th all-time, is the leader among active players.

Key

List

Other Hall of Famers

References

Major League Baseball statistics
Assists as a left outfielder